William Clayton may refer to:

Politics

United Kingdom
 William Clayton (Liverpool MP) (died 1715), Member of Parliament for Liverpool, 1698–1708
 Sir William Clayton, 1st Baronet (died 1744), Member of Parliament for Bletchingley, 1715–1744
 William Clayton, 1st Baron Sundon (1671–1752), MP for Woodstock, St Albans, Westminster, Plympton Erle and St Mawes
 William Clayton (died 1783) (c. 1718–1783), MP for Bletchingley, 1745–1761, and Great Marlow, 1761–1783
 Sir William Clayton, 4th Baronet (1762–1834), Member of Parliament for Great Marlow, 1783–1790
 Sir William Clayton, 5th Baronet (1786–1866), Member of Parliament for Great Marlow, 1832–1842

United States
 William F. Clayton (1923–2017), US politician
 William C. Clayton (1831–1915), American educator, lawyer, politician, and businessperson
 W. H. H. Clayton (1840–1920), American soldier, lawyer, judge in post-Civil War Arkansas and Indian Territory Oklahoma
 William L. Clayton (1880–1966), US assistant secretary of state for economic affairs
 William Clayton (colonist) (1632–1689), acting Governor of the Pennsylvania Colony, 1684–1685
 William Wirt Clayton (1812–1885), judge, director and tax collector in Atlanta, Georgia
 William M. Clayton (1824–?), US politician, mayor of Denver, Colorado, 1868–1869

Other
 William Clayton (Mormon) (1814–1879), Mormon pioneer
 William Clayton (architect) (1823–1877), prominent New Zealand architect
 William Clayton (publisher), publisher of Astounding Stories
 William Cecil Clayton, a character in Edgar Rice Burroughs's Tarzan novels
 William Clayton (Arrowverse), a character in the TV series Arrow

See also
 Clayton baronets
 Clayton (disambiguation)
 Clayton (name)